The Japanese Garden of Ostend or Shin Kai Tei is a park in the Belgian city of Ostend. The garden was designed by Japanese architect Takashi Sawano. It is named Shin Kai Tei, which means Deep Sea Garden in Japanese. It was opened in 2001 by Prince Philippe of Belgium.

History
It was built in the kaiyū-shiki-teien style. The garden is located near Ostend's city center and thus near the North Sea. It was designed by Japanese architect Takashi Sawano. The garden includes a pond and waterfalls, walking path, benches, a gazebo, water plants. The pond features small fish and koi carp. It was opened by Prince Philippe of Belgium (later crowned King of the Belgians) in 2001. The garden extends for over 2500 square meters.

The garden was named Shin Kai Tei, meaning "deep sea garden" (shin meaning "deep", "profound", "wise"; kai meaning "ocean", "sea"; and tei meaning "garden" as well as "sanctuary").

The garden was opened on 20 July 2001, with a traditional Shinto ceremony, which was attended by Prince Philippe. The garden cost about 25 million francs.

Gallery

References

External links
The Japanese Garden at visitoostende.be

Gardens in Belgium
Japanese gardens